Seonghan of Silla, also called  Sehan of Silla, was a Korean Silla Dynasty politician. He was one of the founders of Gyeongju Kim clan. According to some theories, he was a son of Kim Alji, or a seventh-generation descendant of Xiongnu through the Han Dynasty general Jin Midi. He was also known as King Taejo Seonghan.

See also 
 Hyeokgeose of Silla
 Talhae of Silla
 Suro of Geumgwan Gaya

Site web 
 [한마당―김상온] 新羅의 뿌리 국민일보 2004.12.13 
 (채널돋보기) 신라 김씨 왕족은 흉노의 후손일까 매일신문 2008.11.21 
 경주 사천왕사(寺) 사천왕상(四天王像) 왜 4개가 아니라 3개일까 조선일보 2009.02.27 
 [김성회의 뿌리를 찾아서] <6> 김씨의 기원 세계일보 2011.04.02 
 문무왕릉비 사실상 다 찾은 셈 경향신문 2009.09.03 
 왜 신라 왕족은 흉노의 후손이라 했을까 데일리안 2009.04.23

References

Silla people
Gim clan of Gyeongju
Korean royalty
Korean legends
1st-century Korean people